Achenyo Idachaba (born c. 1970) is an American-born entrepreneur working in Nigeria. She won the Cartier Initiative Award for women in Sub-Saharan Africa in 2014. Her TED talk had over 1.8 million views as of 2020.

Life

Idachaba came to notice after she moved to Ibadan, Nigeria, in 2009 to set up an environmental consultancy. Idachaba had an affinity with Nigeria as her parents had been born there and she had spent some time visiting when she was younger although she was born and educated in America. She worked as a computer scientist and business analyst before moving to Nigeria to set up an environmental consultancy business.

She realised that Water Hyacinth (Eichornia crassipes) which was recognised as an invasive weed could be harvested as she had read of this happening in Asia. In collaboration with local craftspeople she set up a range of products that were woven from the dried plants. The company was called Mitimeth. She developed products such as a waste basket and a table tidy which were made from plants that are usually only known for being invasive. These plants were originally from South America and can be seen as attractive in a domestic garden, however they have been called the "worst aquatic plant" as they grow so abundantly that they create large floating mats of plants that quickly reproduce. By 2013 she had won a grant from the government and she was employing seven staff. The weeds are harvested, dried and then made into rope which can then be made into products.

In 2014 her efforts were recognised when she was given the Cartier award. This was the women's initiative award for sub-Saharan Africa — which had also been won the year before by another Nigerian, Bilikiss Adebiyi Abiola. She has been featured on CNN.

References

Nigerian women in business
Nigerian businesspeople
People from Ibadan
1970 births
Living people
Year of birth uncertain